Bala Do Ab (also Romanized as Bālā Do Āb; also known as Do Āb, Dow Āb, Duab, Lā Do Āb, and Rovāt Sar) is a village in Rastupey Rural District, in the Central District of Savadkuh County, Mazandaran Province, Iran. At the 2006 census, its population was 104, in 31 families.

References 

Populated places in Savadkuh County